Arctowskifjellet is a mountain in Nordenskiöld Land at Spitsbergen, Svalbard. It has a height of 958 m.a.s.l. The mountain is named after Polish geophysicist and Arctic explorer Henryk Arctowski. It is located south of Sassenfjorden, and borders to the valley of Adventdalen.

References

Mountains of Spitsbergen